Chagall Guevara is the title of the only full-length album by the band Chagall Guevara, released in 1991, on MCA Records.

Track listing
All songs written by Nichols, Perkins and Taylor.

 "Murder In The Big House"
 "Escher's World"
 "Play God"
 "Monkey Grinder"
 "Can't You Feel The Chains?"
 "Violent Blue"
 "Love Is A Dead Language"
 "Take Me Back To Love Canal"
 "The Wrong George"
 "Candy Guru"
 "I Need Somebody"
 "The Rub Of Love"
 "If It All Comes True"

Personnel 

 Steve Taylor – lead vocals (except 9, 13), backing vocals (13)
 Dave Perkins – guitars, backing vocals, lead vocals (2, 13)
 L. Arthur Nichols – guitars, backing vocals
 Wade Jaynes – bass guitar
 Mike Mead – drums

Additional musicians
 The Blind Willy Boner Brass, featuring Reno Caruso on trumpet, Waco Caruso on Harmonica and Junior on Trombone – Horns on "Play God"
 Matt Wallace – producer
 Chagall Gueavara – producer
 David Bryson – engineer, mixing
 Mike Corbett – assistant engineer
 Roy Gamble – assistant engineer
 Shawn McLean – assistant engineer
 Ulrich Wild  – assistant engineer
 The Bennett House, Franklin, Tennessee - recording location
 The Tube at Dave's house - additional recording location
 Matt Wallace - mixing
 David Bryson - mixing
 Alpha & Omega, San Francisco, California - mixing location
 Bob Ludwig - mastering
  Masterdisc, New York City - mastering location
 Tim Stedman for Public Eye L.A. - art direction and design
 Michael Lavine - photography

References 

1991 albums
Steve Taylor albums
Albums produced by Matt Wallace
MCA Records albums